Edward Howling (1885–1955) was an English professional footballer who played in the Football League for Bristol City and Middlesbrough as a goalkeeper. He was capped by England at amateur level.

Personal life 
Howling served in the British Armed Forces during the First World War.

Career statistics

References 

English footballers
English Football League players
Place of death missing
Bristol City F.C. players
Date of death missing
1885 births
1955 deaths
Footballers from Stockton-on-Tees
Association football goalkeepers
South Park F.C. players
Middlesbrough F.C. players
Bradford (Park Avenue) A.F.C. players
Pontypridd F.C. players
England amateur international footballers